Podon is a genus of onychopods in the family Podonidae. There are at least four described species in Podon.

Species
These four species belong to the genus Podon:
 Podon intermedius Lilljeborg, 1853
 Podon leuckarti (Sars, 1862)
 Podon leuckartii (G. O. Sars, 1862)
 Podon schmackeri Poppe, 1889

References

Further reading

 

Cladocera
Articles created by Qbugbot